Stadionul Farul is a multi-purpose stadium in Constanța, Romania. It was used mostly for football matches and until 2022 was the home ground of Farul Constanța. The stadium had also functions as an athletics arena, with track and field athletics facilities. The stadium was closed in 2022 and is proposed for demolition, also a new stadium is in plan to be built, on the same site.

In 1970, Stadionul Farul was the first stadium in Romania to host a floodlit football match. The stadium has played host to the Romania national football team, in the World Cup 2006 Qualification, UEFA Euro 2008 qualifying and 2010 FIFA World Cup qualification.

The stadium is currently in bad condition. Many of the seats in the stands are missing or are damaged. In general, the stadium is in need of renovation. In 2016, Farul returned to play in the facility. It is maintained in an operating condition, but there are currently no plans to renew or renovate the stadium. In 2018, supporters of Farul have asked the municipality in an open letter for financial support, also in order to renovate or rebuild the stadium. No plans to renew the facility have been published yet.

Romania national football team
The following national team matches were held in the stadium:

See also
List of football stadiums in Romania

References

Football venues in Romania
Sport in Constanța
Buildings and structures in Constanța
Multi-purpose stadiums in Romania
FCV Farul Constanța